Pan En (Chinese: , Pān Ēn) was a Ming-era government official from Shanghai. He served under the Jiajing Emperor.

His son Pan Yunduan constructed the Yu Garden for him in his old age.

Chinese scholars
Politicians from Shanghai
1496 births
1582 deaths
Ming dynasty politicians